Jerry Nolte (born October 4, 1955) formerly served as a Republican member of the Missouri House of Representatives. He is a former teacher. He resides in Gladstone, Missouri.

He has been an advertising artist working out of his own studio since 1978.  He has also been an art teacher at Oakhill Day School.  He attends St. Charles Catholic Church in Gladstone, and is an officer of the Knights of Columbus.

He was first elected to the Missouri House of Representatives in 2004, and served on the following committees:
Appropriations - Public Safety and Corrections,
Local Government, and
Tourism.

On 28 February 2008, Nolte introduced House Bill No. 1463 providing "that aliens unlawfully present in the United States shall not be eligible for enrollment in the university or college."

References
Official Manual, State of Missouri, 2005-2006. Jefferson City, MO: Secretary of State.

1955 births
Living people
People from Gladstone, Missouri
Members of the Missouri House of Representatives